John Knott may refer to:

 John Knott (scientist) (1938–2017), British metallurgist
 John Knott (cricketer) (1901–1988), English cricketer for Kent and Oxford 
 John Knott (public servant) (1910–1999), Australian civil servant
 John Knott (sport shooter) (1914–1965), British Olympic shooter
 John F. Knott (1878–1963) American cartoonist

See also
 Jon Knott, American baseball player
 Jonathan Nott, British Ambassador to Poland
 John Nott (disambiguation)